In mathematics, unimodular may refer to any of the following:

 Unimodular lattice
 Unimodular matrix
 Unimodular polynomial matrix
 Unimodular form
 Unimodular group